Life Unawares is a 2007 Russian film directed by Alexander Brunkovsky.

Plot
Masha —  an eighteen-year girl, dreams of a completely different life. One day, hitting the casting of "reality shows", she meets with the producer of the project. Mutual attraction opens the door to her into the world of show business. Masha agrees to participate in this "reality show", but she is faced with serious moral issues that affect her life.

Cast
Alexandra Prokofyeva as Masha
Sergei Batalov as Masha's father
Marina Yakovleva as Masha's mom
Dmitry Kozlov as Tyoma
Artyom Krestovsky as Bull
Dmitry Kubasov as Vovan
Markus Kunze as Amadeus
Tatyana Lavrentyeva as Frau Tilleman
 Vsevolod Shilovsky as Sidor Kamilovich
 Dmitry Sharakois as Artyom
 Mika Newton as cameo

External links

 

2007 films
2007 drama films
2000s Russian-language films
Russian drama films
Gorky Film Studio films